Mara Švel-Gamiršek, also known as Mara Schwell (3 January 1900 – 7 December 1975) was Croatian writer from Syrmia. Beside prose, she also wrote poetry.

Early life and education 
Mara Švel-Gamiršek was born in Sremska Mitrovica, Kingdom of Croatia-Slavonia, Kingdom of Hungary, Austria-Hungary (today Vojvodina, Serbia), 3 January 1900, in the family of Šokci Croats.

She attended the elementary school in Sremska Mitrovica. She continued her education in gymnasium in Sušak, and after that, she went to study medicine. She didn't complete her medical degree as she married.

Career
From 1923, she turned to her literary work. Later, she moved to Zagreb.

She began publishing her works in early 1940s, at Matica hrvatska. Already then, her works were drawing attention from readers. Being Šokica herself, she has described the life of Šokci Croats in her books. In wider sense, she belonged to the phenomenon of žensko šokačko pismo ("female literature of Šokci"). She was the working with magazine Hrvatska revija, publishing some of her poetry in it in 1976.

Death and legacy 
She died in Zagreb, 7 December 1975. The elementary school in Vrbanja, in eastern Croatia, is named after Mara Švel-Gamiršek.

Works 
 Šuma i Šokci, 1940
 Hrast, Zagreb, 1942
 Portreti nepoznatih žena, 1942
 Priče za Sveu i Karen, 1967
 Legende, 1969
 Izabrana djela, 1970
 Ovim šorom Jagodo, 1975

References

Further reading 
 Katica Čorkalo: Poslanica Mari Švel-Gamiršek / An Epistle to Mara Švel-Gamiršek, in:  The papers presented at the scientific conference held in 1997, str. 53-56, Hrašće, Drenovci, 1998.

External links 
 LZMK / Hrvatska enciklopedija: Švel-Gamiršek, Mara
 Oš Mara Švel-Gamiršek Vrbanja About the name of elementary school in Vrbanja
 Matica hrvatska - ogranak Tovarnik Hrvatska riječ u Srijemu - Antologija srijemskih pisaca (photo)
Croatian Academy of Sciences and Arts Katica Čorkalo: Scientific works

1900 births
1975 deaths
People from Sremska Mitrovica
Croatian novelists
Croats of Vojvodina
Croatian women writers
20th-century women writers
Croatian women novelists
20th-century novelists
20th-century Croatian poets
Croatian women poets